Landgravine Elisabeth Juliana Francisca of Hesse-Homburg (6 January 1681 – 12 November 1707), official titles: Landgräfin zu Hessen, Fürstin zu Hersfeld, Gräfin zu Katzenelnbogen, Diez, Ziegenhain, Nidda, Schaumburg, Isenburg und Büdingen, was a landgravine from the House of Hesse-Homburg and through marriage Fürstin of Nassau-Siegen.

Biography

Elisabeth Juliana Francisca was born at Homburg Castle on 6 January 1681, the fifth daughter of Landgrave Frederick II of Hesse-Homburg and his second wife Duchess Louise Elisabeth of Courland. Elisabeth Juliana Francisca was baptised on 13 January.

Elisabeth Juliana Francisca married at Homburg Castle on 7 January 1702 to Fürst Frederick William Adolf of Nassau-Siegen (Siegen, 20 February 1680 – Nassauischer Hof, Siegen, 13 February 1722), the eldest son of Fürst William Maurice of Nassau-Siegen and Princess Ernestine Charlotte of Nassau-Schaumburg. On the death of his father in 1691, Frederick William Adolf succeeded his father as the territorial lord of the Protestant part of the principality of Nassau-Siegen and co-ruler of the city of Siegen. He possessed the district of Siegen (with the exception of seven villages) and the districts of Hilchenbach and Freudenberg. He shared the city of Siegen with the Catholic Fürst of Nassau-Siegen. Because he was still a minor, he was under the guardianship and regency of his mother until 1701.

The hospitality of the magistrate of Siegen was always guided by the utmost frugality. When Elisabeth Juliana Francisca’s father (who later became known in literature as Prinz Friedrich von Homburg through Heinrich von Kleist) visited the Nassauischer Hof in 1702, he was given the obligatory gift of wine by the city. At an evening reception in the town hall, however, the landgrave had to settle for beer, because – according to the city’s accounts – ‘er seinen Wein bereits erhalten habe’ (‘he already had received his wine’). As a special honour, however, the magistrate had engaged the city pipers from Cologne for the festive reception, who certainly played at the dinner and the ball.

Elisabeth Juliana Francisca died in the Nassauischer Hof in Siegen on 12 November 1707, 26 years old, five days after the birth of her daughter Sophia Elizabeth. She was buried in the  there on 14 November.

Amalie Louise was not only a first cousin of Frederick William Adolf but also of Elisabeth Juliana Francisca.

In October 1712 Frederick William Adolf and William Hyacinth, the Catholic Fürst of Nassau-Siegen, reached an agreement about their share in the city of Siegen. William Hyacinth ceded the Catholic land to Frederick William Adolf in exchange for an annual pension of 12,000 Reichsthalers. There was even an intention to marry off Maria Anna Josepha, William Hyacinth’s underage daughter, to the even younger reformed Hereditary Prince Frederick William, Elisabeth Juliana Francisca’s only son. All this was done not in the least to get rid of the troublesome foreign administration. Since April 1707 the Catholic part of the principality of Nassau-Siegen had, by order of the Aulic Council, been under the administration of the cathedral chapter in Cologne because of the maladministration of William Hyacinth. Frederick William succeeded his father in 1722 but was under the guardianship and regency of his stepmother Amalie Louise until 1727.

Issue

From the marriage of Elisabeth Juliana Francisca and Frederick William Adolf the following children were born:
 Charlotte Frederica (Siegen, 30 November 1702 – Stadthagen, 22 July 1785), married:
 in Weimar on 27 June 1725 to Fürst Leopold of Anhalt-Köthen (Köthen, 29 November 1694Jul. – Köthen, 19 November 1728).
 in Varel on 26 April 1730 to Count Albrecht Wolfgang of Schaumburg-Lippe-Bückeburg (Bückeburg, 27 April 1699 – Bückeburg, 24 September 1748).
 Sophia Mary (Nassauischer Hof, Siegen, 28 January 1704 – Nassauischer Hof, Siegen, 28 August 1704).
 Sibylle Henriette Eleonore (Nassauischer Hof, Siegen, 21 September 1705 – Nassauischer Hof, Siegen, 5 September 1712).
 Fürst Frederick William II (Nassauischer Hof, Siegen, 11 November 1706 – Nassauischer Hof, Siegen, 2 March 1734), succeeded his father in 1722. Married at Ludwigseck Hunting Lodge near  on 23 September 1728 to Countess Sophie Polyxena Concordia of Sayn-Wittgenstein-Hohenstein (Berlin, 28 May 1709 – , Siegen, 15 December 1781).
 Sophia Elizabeth (Nassauischer Hof, Siegen, 7 November 1707 – Nassauischer Hof, Siegen, 5 October 1708).

Ancestors

Notes

References

Sources
 
 
 
 
 
 
 
 
 
 
 
 
 
 
  (2004). "Die Fürstengruft zu Siegen und die darin von 1669 bis 1781 erfolgten Beisetzungen". In:  u.a. (Redaktion), Siegener Beiträge. Jahrbuch für regionale Geschichte (in German). Vol. 9. Siegen: Geschichtswerkstatt Siegen – Arbeitskreis für Regionalgeschichte e.V. p. 183–202.
 
 
  (1882). Het vorstenhuis Oranje-Nassau. Van de vroegste tijden tot heden (in Dutch). Leiden: A.W. Sijthoff/Utrecht: J.L. Beijers.

External links

 Nassau. In: Medieval Lands. A prosopography of medieval European noble and royal families, compiled by Charles Cawley.
 Nassau Part 5. In: An Online Gotha, by Paul Theroff.
 Nassau-Siegen, Juliane Franziska Fürstin von (in German). In: Landesgeschichtliches Informationssystem Hessen (LAGIS) (in German).

|-

Hesse-Homburg, Elisabeth Juliana Francisca
Hesse-Homburg, Elisabeth Juliana Francisca
Hesse-Homburg, Elisabeth Juliana Francisca
House of Hesse-Homburg
∞
Landgravines of Germany
Princesses of Nassau
People from Bad Homburg vor der Höhe
Hesse-Homburg, Elisabeth Juliana Francisca
Hesse-Homburg, Elisabeth Juliana Francisca
Daughters of monarchs